Jack Kenneth Hale (3 October 1928 – 9 December 2009) was an American mathematician working primarily in the field of dynamical systems and functional differential equations.

Biography
Jack Hale defended his Ph.D. thesis "On the Asymptotic Behavior of the Solutions of Systems of Differential Equations" at Purdue University under Lamberto Cesari in 1954; his undergraduate years were spent at Berea College, where he was studying Mathematics until 1949.

In 1954–57, Hale worked as a Systems Analyst at Sandia Corporation and in 1957–58 he was a Staff Scientist at Remington Rand Univac. During 1958–64, he was a permanent member of the Research Institute for Advanced Studies (RIAS) in Baltimore, Maryland. He became a faculty member at Brown University in 1964 and worked in the Division of Applied Mathematics for 24 years until 1988, serving as Director of the Lefschetz Center for Dynamical Systems for a number of years. In 1988 Hale moved to the School of Mathematics at the Georgia Institute of Technology where he co-founded the Center for Dynamical Systems and Nonlinear Studies (CDSNS), serving as the Director of the CDSNS from 1989 to 1998.

In 1964, together with Joseph LaSalle, Hale became the founding editor of the Journal of Differential Equations, of which he was later Chief Editor. The following year he shared the 1965 Chauvenet Prize with LaSalle for their exposition in the piece on Differential Equations: Linearity vs. Nonlinearity published in the SIAM Review.
In 1999 he received an honorary doctorate from the University of Rostock (Germany).

Throughout his career, Hale published 15 books, over 200 research papers, and supervised 48 Ph.D. students. He was an Honorary Fellow of the Royal Society of Edinburgh, a Corresponding Member of the Brazilian Academy of Sciences, and a Foreign Member of the Polish Academy of Sciences. The biennial Jack K. Hale Award was established in 2013 by Elsevier with the aim of distinguishing researchers who have made outstanding contributions in the fields of dynamics and differential equations.

Selected works

Books
  Original edition published under title Functional differential equations.
 
 
 
 
 
 
  Original edition published under title An introduction to infinite-dimensional dynamical systems—geometric theory.

Articles
 
 
 Hale, J.K. "Linear Functional-Differential Equations with Constant Coefficients", RIAS Technical Report, 1963.

References

External links

 Yingfei Yi, "An interview with Jack K. Hale", Dynamical Systems Magazine, November 18, 2003, Atlanta.
 Lefschetz Center for Dynamical Systems at Brown University
 Chow SN., Mallet-Paret J. "Obituary of Jack K. Hale", Journal of Dynamics and Differential Equations, volume 22, issue 2, pp. 73–78, 2010.

1928 births
2009 deaths
20th-century American mathematicians
Control theorists
Purdue University alumni
Brown University faculty
Georgia Tech faculty
People from Letcher County, Kentucky